Le Raincy–Villemomble–Montfermeil is a railway station in Le Raincy and Villemomble, Seine-Saint-Denis, France. The station is on the Paris-Est - Strasbourg-Ville railway. The station is served by RER line E services operated by SNCF.

Train services
The station is served by the following service(s):

Local services (RER E) Haussmann–Saint-Lazare–Chelles–Gournay

References

External links

 

Réseau Express Régional stations
Railway stations in Seine-Saint-Denis